U.S. Città di Palermo played the season 2015–16 in the Serie A league and Coppa Italia.

Players

Squad information

Transfers

In

Loans in

Out

Competitions

Serie A

League table

Results summary

Results by round

Matches

Coppa Italia

Statistics

Appearances and goals

|-
! colspan=14 style="background:#EEBBBB; text-align:center"| Goalkeepers

|-
! colspan=14 style="background:#EEBBBB; text-align:center"| Defenders

|-
! colspan=14 style="background:#EEBBBB; text-align:center"| Midfielders

|-
! colspan=14 style="background:#EEBBBB; text-align:center"| Forwards

|-
! colspan=14 style="background:#EEBBBB; text-align:center"| Players transferred out during the season

Goalscorers

Last updated: 15 May 2016

Clean sheets

Last updated: 8 May 2016

References

Palermo F.C. seasons
Palermo